The Goldschmidt School was a school that existed in Berlin, Germany, in the late 1930s. It was founded by Leonore Goldschmidt, a German Jewish educator, after Jewish children were barred from attending public schools in 1938. 

Notable alumni include Stella Goldschlag, who passed as Aryan and betrayed other Jews in hiding during the war. Peter H. Wyden also attended the school and later wrote a biography on Goldschlag.

References

Holocaust-related organizations
Jewish German history
Defunct schools in Berlin
Jews and Judaism in Berlin
Minority schools
Jewish schools in Germany
Segregated schools